Himilce Novas (born 1944 in Havana, Cuba) is a novelist, historian, journalist and human rights activist.

In 1960, her family fled to the United States. Novas was educated in New York City, where she has spent most of her life.

Novas’ career spans several decades and encompasses works of fiction and non-fiction. Her published work includes poetry, plays, novels, reference books, and a cookbook about Latin American cuisine. She began her writing career as a teenager, when Nobel Prize laureate Camilo José Cela published her poems in his literary journal, Papeles de son Armadans. Later, she worked as a journalist, magazine editor and publicist for Vanidades, The New York Times, The Connoisseur, The Christian Science Monitor, and other publications. 

As a human rights activist, Novas was an early member of the National Organization for Women. She continues to work on behalf of women and those in the GBLT community and was featured in the book Feminists Who Changed America, 1963–1975 (2006). She has served on the board of Veteran Feminists of America. 

In 2011, Himilce Novas was the recipient of a National Women's Political Caucus “Women of Courage” Award. Among eight other 2011 recipients included Representative Nancy Pelosi, past Secretary of Labor Alexis Herman and Ambassador Mary Olmsted.  The National Women's Political Caucus established the NWPC Women of Courage awards to honor women from diverse backgrounds who have demonstrated courage by taking a stand on or against unpopular or controversial issues to further civil rights and equality, and who typify women’s leadership. 

As a public speaker and visiting professor at educational institutions such as Wellesley College, the University of California, Santa Barbara, and Clark University, Novas has specialized in a wide range of topics, including her own fiction and non-fiction works, Latino culture, feminism, and Gay and Lesbian history and culture. While living in Santa Barbara, Novas hosted the cultural interview radio talk show, The Novas Report, over KQSB 990-AM. She is a frequent contributor and has served as feature editor for The Multicultural Review.
Himilce Novas’ novel, Princess Papaya, is devoted a chapter in the book
Troubling Nationhood in U.S. Latina Literature: Explorations of Place and Belonging (Latinidad: Transnational Cultures in the United States) By Maya Socolovsky (Rutgers University Press) 
https://www.amazon.com/Princess-Papaya-Himilce-Novas-ebook/dp/B012U7BV62
https://www.amazon.com/s?k=Troubling+Nationhood+in+Latina+Literature+by+Maya+Socolovsky+%28Rutgers+University+Press%29&ref=nb_sb_noss

Selected bibliography

Novels
Mangos, Bananas and Coconuts: A Cuban Love Story (1996) 
Princess Papaya (2005)

Non-fiction
Everything You Need to Know About Latino History (1994;2003;2008) 
Remembering Selena: A Tribute in Pictures and Words/Recordando Selena: Un tributo en palabras y fotos (with Rosemary Silva, 1995) 
Latin American Cooking Across the USA (with Rosemary Silva, 1997)  (trans. La Buena Mesa, 1997)
The Hispanic 100: A Ranking of the Latino Men and Women Who Have Most Influenced American Thought and Culture (1995) 
Passport Spain: Your Pocket Guide to Spanish Business, Customs & Etiquette (with Rosemary Silva, 1997) 
Everything You Need to Know About Asian American History (with Lan Cao, 2004)

References

External links
Novas as public speaker

Metroactive interview

1944 births
Living people
American people of Cuban descent
Writers from New York City
Writers from Havana